Anthony "Lofty" William Charles Eldridge DSC (16 July 1923 – 13 April 2015) was a Royal Navy officer of the Second World War who led a human torpedo attack that sank two Japanese ships off Phuket, Thailand, for which he received the Distinguished Service Cross.

Early life 
Anthony William Charles Eldridge was born on 16 July 1923 in Royal Tunbridge Wells, and for his education he studied at The Skinners' School. While attending the school, Eldridge became a Senior King's Scout.

Second World War

Home Guard 
Eldridge served as a lance-corporal in the Home Guard before joining the Royal Navy in January 1942, when he was eighteen.

Royal Navy 
From there he transferred to the shore establishment  for officer training in September 1943. Eldridge volunteered for special service and was sent for dive training and then in April 1944 began learning to be a human torpedo using a Chariot manned torpedo.

Ceylon Secret Operation 51 

On 27 October 1944, Sub-lieutenant Eldrige and his number two petty officer, Sidney “Butch” Woollcott, boarded their Chariot named Tiny. They were accompanied on their mission by Petty Officer W. S. Smith and Ordinary Seaman Bert Brown aboard their chariot named Slasher. Their mission, Ceylon Secret Operation 51, was to attack Japanese shipping at Phuket Harbour in Thailand. Specifically, the targets were 5000 tonne Sumatra and the 5272 tonne Volpi.

Conveyed to Phuket by the submarine , they launched at 22:00 to pilot their Chariot the final six and a half miles to the target. They arrived at 00:30 but found that the barnacles on the ship prevented the use of magnets to secure their explosive warhead to the Sumatra. Therefore, they attached a clamp to the bilge keel and tied the warhead to the clamp with a rope. Eldridge and Woollcott set the timer for 6 hours, shook hands and began the journey back to Trenchant.  

Their colleagues attacking the Volpi found that the ship was resting on the bottom of the harbour and therefore they could not attach their warhead underneath. Ordinary Seaman Brown boarded the Volpi and set his explosives in the engine room.

Arriving back at the submarine, the men were order to scuttle their chariots by Lieutenant-Commander “Baldy” Hezlet, who believed he had heard enemy propellers. Back aboard Trenchant, Hazlet with a cry of "There she goes!" called Eldridge to the periscope where he saw the second of the two target ships sink. Eldridge saw the force of the explosion sending debris to twice the height of the ship's mast. 

The scuttled chariots were uncovered following the Boxing Day tsunami in 2004. However, another report has their discovery being made by divers. The position is recorded as being near Koh Dok Mai in the Andaman Sea.

Returning to Trincomalee in Ceylon, the men were cheered into the harbour as they stood on the casing of Trenchant. For his exploits Eldridge was awarded the Distinguished Service Cross, which was received  through the post.

Postwar

Salvage and mine clearance 
At the end of the war, Eldridge was assigned to salvage and mine-clearance work before his demobilisation in 1946.

International Computers Limited 
After his military service Eldridge briefly worked as a farmer before joining International Computers Limited. He emigrated to South Africa in 1954, where he continued his work for International Computers Limited installing information management systems.

Rhodesia 
Moving to Rhodesia in 1960, Eldridge joined the British South African Police Reserve attached to the anti-terrorist unit. He served there for 18 years and was awarded the Meritorious Service Medal before moving back to South Africa after Rhodesian Independence.

South African Legion 
Eldridge became prominent in the South African Legion, serving as a local chairman, provincial chairman and life vice president.

Return to Britain 
In 2004 Eldrige returned to the United Kingdom, attending submariners' reunions and parades as well as supporting the British Legion. He became blind through suffering macular degeneration but enjoyed reading after being taught to use a computer by Blind Veterans UK. Eldridge attended the Cenotaph commemorations on Remembrance Sunday each year, of standing on parade he said -

Personal life 
In 1950 Eldridge married Dorothy Perkins, with whom he had three daughters and a son.

Memoirs 
Eldridge wrote his autobiography in 1998 entitled, Just Out of Sight as well as recording an audio-history for the Imperial War Museum.

References 

1923 births
2015 deaths
People educated at The Skinners' School
Military personnel from Kent
Recipients of the Distinguished Service Cross (United Kingdom)
People from Royal Tunbridge Wells
Royal Navy officers of World War II
British Home Guard soldiers
English blind people